The Hole in the Wall Gang was an outlaw gang in the American Wild West.

"Hole in the Wall Gang" can also refer to:

 Hole in the Wall Gang (comedy), an Irish comedy group
 The Hole in the Wall Gang, a group of Las Vegas criminals in the 1970s and 80s formed by Anthony Spilotro
 Hole in the Wall Gang Camp, a summer camp for children with serious illnesses

See also
 Hole in the Wall (disambiguation)